Mark Bailey may refer to:

Mark Bailey (diplomat) (born 1951), Canadian diplomat
Mark Bailey (rugby union) (born 1960), English rugby player, headmaster and professor of Later Medieval History
Mark Bailey (baseball) (born 1961), former catcher in Major League Baseball
Mark Bailey (conductor) (born 1962), conductor and composer of Slavic sacred music
Mark Bailey (cricketer) (born 1970), New Zealand cricketer
Mark Bailey (footballer) (born 1976), former professional football defender
Mark Bailey (politician), Australian politician
Mark Bailey (writer) (born 1968),  American writer
Bill Bailey (born 1965), real name Mark Bailey, British comedian
Mark Bailey, a personal trainer on the British TV series The Biggest Loser